Lalu Island (Thao language: Lalu) is a small island in Sun Moon Lake, Yuchi Township, Nantou County, Taiwan. The island used to be much bigger, separating the lake into a part shaped like crescent moon and another part shaped like a round sun. When the island was still bigger, people lived on it; in fact, the locals  called it "Pearl Mountain"() ever since the Ch'ing dynasty.  Under Japanese rule, the island was renamed , and in the 1930s, the Japanese built a dam that raised the water level in the lake and almost entirely flooded the island. After Chiang Kai-shek's Nationalist Government moved to Taiwan in 1949, the island was renamed Kwanghwa Island. In 1999 the island shrank as portions sank during the 1999 Jiji earthquake, which also destroyed a wedding pavilion constructed by the local government in 1978.

"Lalu" is an Austronesian word roughly corresponding to "after", "later" with similar meanings from Taiwan to Indonesia. In legend, Thao hunters discovered Sun Moon Lake while chasing a white deer through the surrounding mountains. The deer eventually led them to the lake, which they found to be not only beautiful, but abundant with fish. Today, the white deer of legends is immortalized as a marble statue on Lalu Island.

In recent years, due to increasing social and political awareness, more deference and recognition are being given to Taiwanese aborigines.  As a result, after the 921 earthquake, the island was renamed in the Thao language as "Lalu".

Transportation
The island and surrounding area is accessible by buses from Taichung Station or Taipei Main Station.

See also
 List of tourist attractions in Taiwan
 Sun Moon Lake

References

Islands of Taiwan
Lake islands of Asia
Landforms of Nantou County